is  the former Head coach of the Hitachi SunRockers in the National Basketball League (Japan).

References

1979 births
Living people
California State University, Stanislaus alumni
Utsunomiya Brex coaches
Kagoshima Rebnise coaches
Sun Rockers Shibuya coaches
Tokyo Excellence coaches
Yokohama Excellence players
Tokyo Hachioji Bee Trains coaches
Sportspeople from Portland, Oregon
Basketball players from Portland, Oregon
American men's basketball players